Lebia esurialis is a species of beetle in the family Carabidae. It is found in Mexico, on Cuba and Bahamas as well as in such U.S. states as Louisiana and Texas.

References

Further reading

 
 
 
 

Lebia
Articles created by Qbugbot
Beetles described in 1920
Taxa named by Thomas Lincoln Casey Jr.